The Verma cabinet was the Council of Ministers in first Delhi Legislative Assembly headed by Chief Minister Sahib Singh Verma.

Council members
 Rajendra Gupta - Minister of Transport
 Dr. Harsh Vardhan
 Harsharan Singh Balli - Industry, Labour, Jails, Languages and Gurudwara Administration
 Dr. Jagdish Mukhi
 Poornima Sethi
 Surendra Pal Ratawal
 Lal Bihari Tiwari

References

Cabinets established in 1996
1996 establishments in Delhi
Delhi cabinets
Bharatiya Janata Party state ministries
Cabinets disestablished in 1998
1998 disestablishments in India